Klaus Lienemann (born 26 December 1947) is a retired German football defender.

References

1947 births
Living people
German footballers
Chemnitzer FC players
DDR-Oberliga players
Association football defenders